N59 may refer to:
 N59 road (Ireland)
 N59 highway (Philippines)
 , a submarine of the Royal Navy
 Nebraska Highway 59, in the United States
 Rosaschi Air Park, in Lyon County, Nevada, United States